Journal of Neuroscience Nursing is a bimonthly peer-reviewed medical journal covering "neurosurgical and neurological techniques as they affect nursing". It was established in 1969 as the Journal of Neurosurgical Nursing, obtaining its current name in 1986. It is published by Lippincott Williams & Wilkins on behalf of the American Association of Neuroscience Nurses, of which it is the official journal. The editor-in-chief is DaiWai Olson (University of Texas Southwestern Medical Center). According to the Journal Citation Reports, the journal has a 2020 impact factor of 1.230.

References

Journal of Neuroscience Nursing==External links==

Neurology journals
General nursing journals
Publications established in 1969
Bimonthly journals
English-language journals
Lippincott Williams & Wilkins academic journals
Academic journals associated with learned and professional societies of the United States